International Workers' Day, also known as Labour Day in some countries and often referred to as May Day, is a celebration of labourers and the working classes that is promoted by the international labour movement and occurs every year on 1 May, or the first Monday in May.

Traditionally, 1 May is the date of the European spring festival of May Day. In 1889, the Marxist International Socialist Congress met in Paris and established the Second International as a successor to the earlier International Workingmen's Association. They adopted a resolution for a "great international demonstration" in support of working-class demands for the eight-hour day. The 1 May date was chosen by the American Federation of Labor to commemorate a general strike in the United States, which had begun on 1 May 1886 and culminated in the Haymarket affair four days later. The demonstration subsequently became a yearly event. The 1904 Sixth Conference of the Second International, called on "all Social Democratic Party organisations and trade unions of all countries to demonstrate energetically on the First of May for the legal establishment of the eight-hour day, for the class demands of the proletariat, and for universal peace".

The 1st of May, or first Monday in May, is a national public holiday in many countries, in most cases as "International Workers' Day" or a similar name. Some countries celebrate a Labour Day on other dates significant to them, such as the United States and Canada, which celebrate Labor Day on the first Monday of September.

Origin
On 21 April 1856, Australian stonemasons in Victoria undertook a mass stoppage as part of the eight-hour workday movement. It became a yearly commemoration, inspiring American workers to have their first stoppage. 1 May was chosen to be International Workers' Day to commemorate the 1886 Haymarket affair in Chicago. In that year beginning on 1 May, there was a general strike for the eight-hour workday. On 4 May, the police acted to disperse a public assembly in support of the strike when an unidentified person threw a bomb. The police responded by firing on the workers. The event led to the deaths of seven police officers and at least four civilians; sixty police officers were injured, as were one hundred and fifteen civilians. Hundreds of labour leaders and sympathizers were later rounded-up and four were executed by hanging, after a trial that was seen as a miscarriage of justice. The following day on 5 May, in Milwaukee, Wisconsin, the state militia fired on a crowd of strikers killing seven, including a schoolboy and a man feeding chickens in his yard.

In 1889, the first meeting of the Second International was held in Paris, following a proposal by Raymond Lavigne that called for international demonstrations on the 1890 anniversary of the Chicago protests. On 1 May 1890, the call encouraged May Day demonstrations took place in the United States and most countries in Europe. Demonstrations were also held in Chile and Peru. May Day was formally recognized as an annual event at the International's second congress in 1891. Subsequently, the May Day riots of 1894 occurred. The International Socialist Congress, Amsterdam 1904 called on "all Social Democratic Party organisations and trade unions of all countries to demonstrate energetically on the First of May for the legal establishment of the 8-hour day, for the class demands of the proletariat, and for universal peace." The congress made it "mandatory upon the proletarian organisations of all countries to stop work on 1 May, wherever it is possible without injury to the workers."

In the United States and Canada, a September holiday, called Labor or Labour Day, was first proposed in the 1880s. In 1882, Matthew Maguire, a machinist, first proposed a Labor Day holiday on the first Monday of September while serving as secretary of the Central Labor Union (CLU) of New York. Others argue that it was first proposed by Peter J. McGuire of the American Federation of Labor in May 1882, after witnessing the annual labour festival held in Toronto, Canada. In 1887, Oregon was the first state of the United States to make it an official public holiday. By the time it became an official federal holiday in 1894, thirty US states officially celebrated Labor Day. Thus by 1887 in North America, Labour Day was an established, official holiday but in September, not on 1 May.

May Day has been a focal point for demonstrations by various socialist, communist and anarchist groups since the Second International.  May Day is one of the most important holidays in communist countries such as China, Vietnam, Cuba, Laos, North Korea, and the former Soviet Union countries. May Day celebrations in these countries typically feature elaborate workforce parades, including displays of military hardware and soldiers.

In 1955, the Catholic Church dedicated 1 May to "Saint Joseph the Worker". Saint Joseph is the patron saint of workers and craftsmen, among others.

Today, the majority of countries around the world celebrate a workers' day on 1 May.

Soviet Union and Eastern Bloc under socialist governments

Eastern Bloc countries such as the Soviet Union and most countries of central and eastern Europe that were under the rule of Marxist-Leninist governments held official May Day celebrations in every town and city, during which party leaders greeted the crowds. Workers carried banners with political slogans and many companies decorated their company cars. The biggest celebration of 1 May usually occurred in the capital of a particular socialist country and usually included a military display and the presence of the president and the secretary general of the party. During the Cold War, May Day became the occasion for large military parades in Red Square by the Soviet Union and attended by the top leaders of the Kremlin, especially the Politburo, atop Lenin's Mausoleum. It became an enduring symbol of that period. In Poland, since 1982, party leaders led the official parades. In Hungary, May Day was officially celebrated under the communist rule, and remains a public holiday. Traditionally, the day was marked by dancing around designated "May trees".

By country

Africa

Algeria
In Algeria, 1 May is a public holiday celebrated as Labour Day.

Angola
1 May is recognized as public holiday in Angola and called Workers' Day.

Egypt

In Egypt, 1 May is known as Labour Day and is considered a paid holiday. The President of Egypt traditionally presides over the official May Day celebrations.

Ethiopia
In Ethiopia, 1 May is a public holiday and celebrated as Worker's Day.

Ghana
1 May is a holiday in Ghana. It is a day to celebrate all workers across the country. It is celebrated with a parade by trade unions and labour associations. The parades are normally addressed by the Secretary General of the trade union congress and by regional secretaries in the regions. Workers from different workplaces through banners and T-shirts identify their companies.

Kenya
In Kenya, 1 May is a public holiday and celebrated as Labour Day. It is a big day addressed by the leaders of the workers' umbrella union body – the Central Organisation of Trade Unions (COTU). The Cabinet Secretary in charge of Ministry  of Labour and Social Protection (and occasionally the President) address the workers. Each year, the government approves (and increases) the minimum wage on Labour Day.

Libya
In Libya, International Workers' Day was declared a national public holiday by the National Transitional Council in 2012 the first year of the post-Qaddafi era.

On 1 May 1978, then Libyan leader Colonel Mu'ammar Al-Qaddafi addressed the nation in the capital city of Tripoli calling for administrative and also economic reforms across Libya.

Mauritius
In Mauritius, 1 May is a public holiday celebrated as Labour Day. It was celebrated for the first time in Mauritius on 1 May 1938, and for the first time as an official public holiday on 1 May 1950. This was thanks largely to the efforts of Guy Rozemont, Dr. Maurice Curé, Pandit Sahadeo and Emmanuel Anquetil, as a day of special significance for Mauritian workers who for many years had struggled for their social, political and economic rights. And, as we all can see for ourselves, that struggle is a never-ending one.

Morocco
In Morocco, 1 May is recognized as a public holiday on 1 May.

Mozambique
Celebrates workers day on 1 May in Mozambique.

Namibia
1 May is recognized as public holiday in Namibia and celebrated as Workers' Day.

Nigeria
Since 1981, 1 May is a public holiday in Nigeria. On the day, people gather while, traditionally, the president of the Nigeria Labour Congress and other politicians address workers.

Somalia
In Somalia, 1 May is a public holiday and celebrated as the Labour Day.

South Africa
In South Africa, Workers' Day has been celebrated as a national public holiday on 1 May each year since 1995. May Day started to get more attention by African workers in 1928, which saw thousands of workers in a mass march. In 1950, the South African Communist Party called for a strike on 1 May in response to the Suppression of Communism Act declaring it illegal. Police violence caused the death of 18 people across Soweto. It has its origins within the historical struggles of workers and their trade unions internationally for solidarity between working people in their struggles to win fair employment standards and more importantly, to establish a culture of human and worker rights and to ensure that these are enshrined in international law and the national law.

In 1986, the hundredth anniversary of the Haymarket affair, the Congress of South African Trade Unions (COSATU) called for the government to establish an official holiday on 1 May. It also called for workers to stay home from work that day. COSATU was joined by a number of prominent anti-apartheid organizations, including the National Education Crisis Committee and the United Democratic Front (South Africa). The call was also supported by a number of organizations regarded as conservative, such as the African Teachers' Association of South Africa, the National African Federated Chamber of Commerce, and the Steel and Engineering Industries Federation of South Africa, an organization that represented employers in the metal industries. More than 1,500,000 workers observed the call and stayed home, as did thousands of students, taxi drivers, vendors, shopkeepers, domestic workers, and self-employed people. In the following years, 1 May  became a popular, if not official, holiday. As a result of the killings on May Day 1950 and the success of COSATU's call in 1986, 1 May became associated with resistance to the apartheid government. After its first universal election in 1994, 1 May was adopted as a public holiday, celebrated for the first time in 1995. On its website, the city of Durban states that the holiday "celebrate[s] the role played by trade unions and other labour movements in the fight against South Africa's apartheid regime".

Tanzania
In Tanzania, it is a public holiday on 1 May and celebrated as the Worker's Day.

Tunisia

1 May is recognized as Labour Day within Tunisia.

Uganda
In Uganda, Labour Day is a public holiday on 1 May.

Zimbabwe
1 May is recognized as public holiday in Zimbabwe and called Workers' Day.

Americas

Argentina
In Argentina, Workers' Day is an official holiday on 1 May, and is frequently associated with labour unions. Celebrations related to labour are held including demonstrations in major cities.

The first Workers' Day celebration was in 1890, when Argentinian unions organized several celebrations in Buenos Aires and other cities, at the same time that the international labour movement celebrated it for the first time. In 1930, it was established as an official holiday by the Radical Civic Union president Hipólito Yrigoyen. The day became particularly significant during the worker-oriented government of Juan Domingo Perón (1946–55). He permitted and endorsed national recognition of the holiday during his tenure in office.

Bolivia
1 May is known as Labour Day and is a holiday. By custom, it is usually the day on which wage increases (e.g., the national minimum wage) and other labor improvements are announced by the Government. In recent years it was also the day chosen by the Bolivian government to announce the (re)nationalization of strategic sectors of the economy (e.g. hydrocarbons in 2006, telecommunications in 2008, electricity in 2010, etc.).

Brazil
In Brazil, Workers' Day is an official holiday that is celebrated on 1 May, and unions commemorate it with day-long public events.

Canada

In Canada, Labour Day is celebrated in September. In 1894, the government of Prime Minister John Sparrow David Thompson declared the first Monday in September as Canada's official Labour Day. Labor Day in the United States is on the same day.

May Day is however marked by unions and leftists. It is celebrated on 1 May. May Day is an important day of trade union and community group protest in the province of Quebec (though not a provincial statutory holiday). Celebration of the International Labour Day (or "International Workers' Day") in Montreal goes back to 1906, organized by the Mutual Aid circle. The tradition had a renaissance at the time of a mass strike in 1972. On the 1973 May Day, the first contemporary demonstration was organized by the major trade union confederations; over 30,000 trade unionists took part in this demonstration.  Further, it is the customary date on which the minimum wage rises.

Chile

President Carlos Ibáñez del Campo decreed 1 May a national holiday in 1931, in honour of the dignity of workers. All stores and public services must close for the entire day, and the major trade unions of Chile, represented in the national organization Workers' United Center of Chile (Central Unitaria de Trabajadores), organize rallies during the morning hours, with festivities and cookouts in the later part of the day, in all the major cities of Chile. During these rallies, representatives of the major left-wing political parties speak to the assemblies on the issues of the day concerning workers' rights.

Colombia
1 May has long been recognized as Labour Day and almost all workers respect it as a national holiday. As in many other countries, it is common to see rallies by the trade unions in all over the main regional capitals of the country.

Costa Rica
First celebrated in 1913, labor day is a public holiday, and at the same time an important day for government activities.  On this day, the President of Costa Rica gives a speech to the citizens and the legislature of Costa Rica about the duties that were undertaken through the previous year. The president of the legislature is also chosen by its members.

Cuba
This day is known as Labour Day in Cuba. People march in the streets, showing their support to the Cuban Communist government and the Cuban Revolution during the whole morning.

Dominican Republic
1 May is a national holiday known as Labour Day and celebrated by workers' parades and demonstration.

Ecuador
In Ecuador, 1 May is an official public holiday known as Labour Day. People do not go to work and spend time with their relatives or gather for demonstrations.

El Salvador
1 May is an official public holiday known as Labour Day.

Guatemala
1 May is an official public holiday known as Labour Day.

Haiti
1 May is an official public holiday known as Agriculture and Labour Day.

Honduras
1 May is an official holiday, known as "Labour Day" within Honduras.

Mexico
1 May is a federal holiday. It also commemorates the Cananea Strike of 1906 in the Mexican state of Sonora.

Panama
1 May is an official public holiday, known as "Labour Day" within Panama.

Paraguay
1 May is an official public holiday, known as "Labour Day" within Paraguay.

Peru
1 May is an official public holiday, known as "Labour Day" within Peru.

United States

In the United States, a "Labor Day", celebrated on the first Monday of each September was given increasing state recognition from 1887, and became an official federal holiday in 1894.

Efforts to switch Labor Day from September to 1 May have not been successful.

In 1947, 1 May was established as Loyalty Day by the U.S. Veterans of Foreign Wars as a way to counter communist influence and recruitment at May Day rallies. Loyalty Day was celebrated across the country with patriotic parades and ceremonies, however the growing conflict over U.S. involvement in Vietnam detracted from the popularity of these celebrations. In 1958, the American Bar Association campaigned to have 1 May designated as Law Day, which was acknowledged in 1961 by a joint resolution of Congress. Law Day exercises, such as mock trials and courthouse tours, are often sponsored by the American Bar Association.

Unions and Political organizations including anarchist groups and socialist and communist parties have kept the international May Day tradition alive with rallies and demonstrations. In 1919 especially large demonstrations took place, and violence greeted the normally peaceful parades in Boston, New York, and Cleveland and a number of people were killed. In Milwaukee, an annual commemoration takes place at the site of the killing of seven workers during an 8-hour march. Some of the largest examples of this occurred during the Great Depression of the 1930s, when hundreds of thousands of workers marched in May Day parades in New York's Union Square, while cities like Chicago and Duluth saw large demonstrations organized by the Communist Party.

In 2006, 1 May was chosen by mostly Latino immigrant groups in the United States as the day for the Great American Boycott, a general strike of undocumented immigrant workers and supporters to protest H.R. 4437, immigration reform legislation that they felt was draconian.
From 10 April to 1 May of that year, immigrant families in the U.S. called for immigrant rights, workers' rights and amnesty for undocumented workers. They were joined by socialist and other leftist organizations on 1 May. On 1 May 2007, a mostly peaceful demonstration in Los Angeles in support of undocumented immigrant workers ended with a widely televised dispersal by police officers. In March 2008, the International Longshore and Warehouse Union announced that dockworkers will move no cargo at any West Coast ports on 1 May 2008, as a protest against the continuation of the Iraq War and the diversion of resources from domestic needs.

On 1 May 2012, members of Occupy Wall Street and labor unions held protests together in a number of cities in the United States and Canada to commemorate May Day and to protest the state of the economy and economic inequality.

On 1 May 2017, immigrants' rights advocates, labor unions and leftists held protests against the immigration and economic policies of President Donald Trump in cities throughout the US, Chicago and Los Angeles having some of the largest marches.

On 1 May 2020, during the COVID-19 pandemic, "workers at Amazon, Whole Foods, Instacart, Walmart, FedEx, Target, and Shipt say they will walk off the job ... to protest their employers’ failure to provide basic protections for frontline workers who are risking and losing their lives at work." Additionally, on the same day, there will be a rent strike, the largest in nearly a century.

On 1 May 2021, Black Bloc protesters clashed with police in Oakland & Portland. Numerous other May Day activities occurred across the country.

Uruguay
In Uruguay, 1 May – Workers' Day – is an official holiday. Even when it is associated with labour unions, almost all workers tend to respect it. Since the late 1990s, the main event takes place at the First of May Square in Montevideo.

Venezuela
1 May is an official holiday in Venezuela.  is celebrated on 1 May in Venezuela since 1936, but from 1938 to 1945 it was held on 24 July, by an order of Eleazar López Contreras. However, Isaías Medina Angarita changed it back to 1 May in 1945.

East Asia

Mainland China 

1 May is a statutory holiday in the People's Republic of China. It was a three-day holiday until 2008, but was only one day between 2008 and 2019, and was restored to three days after 2019. However, the actual time off is often longer than the time off in the regulations, and the extra time off is usually supplemented by another two weekends, but since the extra time is not under an official holiday, the extra days must be "made up" by working on the preceding or following weekend. For example, in 2013, 1 May fell on Wednesday. Most workplaces, including all government offices, took Monday 29 April, Tuesday 30 April, and Wednesday 1 May off. As the first two days were not statutory holidays they had to be "made up" by working the preceding weekend (27 and 28 April).

Hong Kong S.A.R. 
In Hong Kong, 1 May is known as Labour Day and has been considered a public holiday since 1999.

Macau S.A.R. 

Taiwan
1 May is known as Labor Day in Taiwan, an official holiday, though not everybody gets a day off. Students and teachers do not have this day off.

Japan

May Day is not officially designated by the Japanese government as a national holiday, but as it lies between other national holidays, it is a day off work for the vast majority of Japanese workers. Many employers give it as a day off, and otherwise workers take it as "paid leave". 1 May occurs during "Golden Week", together with 29 April ("Shōwa Day"), 3 May ("Constitution Memorial Day"), 4 May ("Greenery Day") and 5 May ("Children's Day"). Workers generally take the day off work not so much to join street rallies or labour union gatherings, but more to go on holiday for several consecutive days (in Japanese corporate culture, taking weekdays off for personal pleasure is widely frowned upon).

Some major labour unions organize rallies and demonstrations in Tokyo, Osaka, and Nagoya. Japan has a long history of labour activism and has had a communist and socialist party in the Diet since 1945. In 2008, the National Confederation of Trade Unions (Zenrōren) held a rally in Yoyogi Park attended by 44,000 participants, while the National Trade Unions Council (Zenrōkyō) held its May Day rally at Hibiya Park. Rengō, the largest Japanese trade union, held its May Day rally on the following Saturday (3 May), allegedly to distance itself from the more radical labour unions.

North Korea
In the Democratic People's Republic of Korea, 1 May is known as International Workers' Day, and is a public holiday. Celebrations, local meetings and rallies are held every year throughout the country to honor the holiday. The Rungnado May Day Stadium in the capital of Pyongyang is named in honor of the holiday.

South Korea
In the Republic of Korea, 1 May is known simply as "Workers' Day". It is not a public holiday, but a paid holiday for workers by the Designation of Workers' Day Act.

Europe

Albania
Labour Day is an official holiday celebrated on 1 May and thus schools and most businesses are closed.

Armenia
Labour Day is an official holiday celebrated on 1 May.

Austria
Labour Day, officially called  (state's holiday), is a public holiday in Austria. Left parties, especially social democrats organize celebrations with marches and speeches in all major cities. In smaller towns and villages those marches are held the night before.

Belgium
In Belgium, Labour Day, is observed on 1 May and is an official holiday since 1948. Various socialist and communist organizations hold parades and other events in different cities.

Bosnia and Herzegovina
In Bosnia and Herzegovina, 1 and 2 May (Bosnian and  /) are an official holiday and day-off for public bodies and schools at the national level. Most people celebrate this holiday by visiting natural parks and resorts. Additionally, in some places public events are organized. In its capital city, Sarajevo, 12 and 13 June are also celebrated as Labour day  due to its many natural parks and springs.

Bulgaria
Labour Day is one of the public holidays in Bulgaria, where it is known as Labour Day and International Workers' Solidarity Day and celebrated annually on 1 May. The first attempt to celebrate it was in 1890 by the Bulgarian Typographical Association. In 1939, Labour Day was declared an official holiday. Since 1945 the communist authorities in the People's Republic of Bulgaria began to celebrate the holiday every year. After the end of socialism in Bulgaria in 1989 Labour Day continues to be an official and public holiday, but state authorities are not committed to the organization of mass events.

Croatia
In Croatia, 1 May is a national holiday. Many public events are organized and held all over the country where bean soup is given out to all people as a symbol of a real workers' dish. Red carnations are also handed out to symbolise the origin of the day. In Zagreb, the capital, a major gathering is in Maksimir Park, which is located in the east part of Zagreb. In Split, city on the coast, people go to Marjan, a park-forest at the western end of Split peninsula.

Cyprus
In Cyprus, 1 May is considered as an official Public Holiday (Labour Day). In general, all stores remain closed in public and private sector. The Labor Union and Syndicates celebrate with various festivals and events across the country.

Czech Republic
In the Czech Republic, 1 May is an official and national holiday known as Labour Day.

Denmark
In Denmark, 1 May is not an official holiday, but a variety of individuals, mostly in the public sector, construction industry, and production industry, get a half or a whole day off. It was first celebrated in Copenhagen in 1890. The location of the first celebration, the Fælledparken, still plays an important part today with speeches by politicians and trade unionists to mark the occasion. Many other events are also held around the country to commemorate the day.

Estonia
In Estonia, 1 May is a public holiday and celebrated as part of May Day (Kevadpüha). It also coincides with Walpurgis Day (volbripäev).

Finland

In Finland, 1 May is an official and national holiday. Apart from Workers' Day (officially: , "day of Finnish labour"), it is also celebrated as a feast of students, and spring, called  or Walpurgis Night.

France

In France, 1 May is a public holiday. It is, in fact, the only day of the year when employees are legally obliged to be given leave, save professions that cannot be interrupted due to their nature (such as workers in hospitals and public transport). Demonstrations and marches are a Labour Day tradition in France, where trade unions organize parades in major cities to defend workers' rights.
It is also customary to offer a lily of the valley to friends or family. This custom dates back to 1561, when king Charles IX, aged 10, waiting for his accession to the throne, gave a lily of the valley to all ladies present. Today, the fiscal administration exempts individuals and workers' organizations from any tax or administrative duties related to the sales of lilies of the valley, provided they are gathered from the wild, and not bought to be resold.

Germany
In April 1933, the recently installed Nazi government declared 1 May the "Day of National Work", an official state holiday, and announced that all celebrations were to be organized by the government. Any separate celebrations by Communists, Social Democrats or labour unions were banned. After World War II, 1 May remained a state holiday in both East and West Germany. In communist East Germany, workers were de facto required to participate in large state-organized parades on May Day. Today in Germany it is simply called "Labour Day", and there are numerous demonstrations and celebrations by independent workers' organizations. Today, Berlin witnesses yearly demonstrations on May Day, the largest organised by labour unions, political parties, the far left and the leftist .

Since 1987, May Day has also become known for riots in some districts of Berlin. After police actions against radical leftists in that year's annual demonstrations, the Autonomen scattered and sought cover at the ongoing annual street fair in Kreuzberg. Three years prior to the reunification of Germany, violent protests would only take place in the former West Berlin. The protesters began tipping over police cars, violently resisting arrest, and began building barricades after the police withdrew due to the unforeseen resistance. Cars were set on fire, shops plundered and burned to the ground. The police eventually ended the riots the following night. These violent forms of protests by the radical left later increasingly involved participants without political motivation.

Annual street fairs have proven an effective way to prevent riots, and May Day in 2005 and 2006 have been among the most peaceful known to Berlin in nearly 25 years. In recent years, neo-Nazis and other groups on the far right, such as the National Democratic Party of Germany, have used the day to schedule public demonstrations, often leading to clashes with left-wing protesters, which turned especially violent in Leipzig in 1998 and 2005.

May Day violence flared up again in 2010. After an approved far-right demonstration was blocked by leftists, a parade by an estimated 10,000 leftists and anarchists turned violent and resulted in an active response by the Berlin Police.

Greece
In Greece 1 May is an optional public holiday. The Ministry of Labour retains the right to classify it as an official public holiday on an annual basis, and it customarily does so.  The day is called  ("Workers' 1 May") and celebrations are marked by demonstrations in which left-wing political parties, anti-authority groups, and workers' unions participate.
On May Day in 2010, there were major protests all over Greece, most notably Athens and Thessaloniki, by many left, anarchist and communist supporters and some violent clashes with riot police who were sent out to contain the protesters. They opposed economic reforms, an end to job losses and wage cuts in the face of the government's proposals of massive public spending cuts. These reforms are to fall in line with the IMF-EU-ECB loan proposals, which demand that Greece liberalize its economy and cut its public spending and private sector wages, which many believe will decrease living standards.

Hungary
Hungary celebrates 1 May as a national holiday, with open-air festivities and fairs all over the country. Many towns raise May poles and festivals with various themes are organized around the holiday. Left-wing parties and trade unions hold public rallies commemorating Labour Day.

Iceland
In Iceland the Labour Day is a public holiday. The first demonstration for workers rights in Iceland occurred in 1923. A parade composed of trade unions and other groups marches through towns and cities across the country and speeches are delivered. However, some private businesses are open, mainly in the capital.

Ireland

The Irish Congress of Trade Unions (ICTU) marks May Day with rallies take place in Belfast and Dublin and other events such as lectures, concerts and film screenings also take place around a wider May Day festival. The first Monday in May has been a public holiday in the Republic of Ireland since 1994 and in Northern Ireland since 1978. In the Republic the public holiday was demanded by the ICTU and proposed by the Labour Party in negotiating its 1992–94 coalition government with Fianna Fáil, and marked the centenary of the ICTU's predecessor, the Irish Trades Union Congress. The public holiday has no official designation, as "Workers' Day" or otherwise. In 2005, Labour's Ruairi Quinn condemned, as a slight to workers, an alleged Fianna Fáil proposal to replace the May holiday with one on 24 April commemorating the 1916 Rising; in fact the proposal was for an extra holiday.

Italy

The first May Day celebration in Italy took place in 1890. It started initially as an attempt to celebrate workers' achievements in their struggle for their rights and for better social and economic conditions. It was abolished under the Fascist regime and immediately restored after the Second World War. May Day is now an important celebration in Italy and is a national holiday regardless of what day of the week it falls. The  ("1st of May Concert"), organized by Italian labour unions in Rome in Piazza di Porta San Giovanni has become an important event in recent years. Every year the concert is attended by a large audience of mostly young people and involves the participation of many famous bands and songwriters, lasting from 15:00 until midnight. The concert is usually broadcast live by Rai 3.

Lithuania
First May Day is an official public holiday celebrated as International Work Day. Celebrations for workers' day were mandatory during the Soviet occupation, and carry a negative connotation as a result today. As Lithuania declared its independence in 1990, Work Day lost its public holiday status, but regained it in 2001.

Latvia
First May Day is an official public holiday celebrated as Convocation of the Constituent Assembly of the Republic of Latvia, Labour Day.

Luxembourg

Malta
In Malta, 1 May is an official public holiday celebrated as "Workers' Day", together with the religious feast of Saint Joseph the Worker. (Saint Joseph's Day, 19 March, the saint's main feast, is also a public holiday in Malta. A Labour mass meeting takes place on 1 May. Nationalists celebrate accession to the European Union on 1 May 2004.

Montenegro
1 May is an official public holiday and a day off work and a day out of school. It is the only official holiday from socialist times that is still officially celebrated.

Netherlands
In the Netherlands, 1 May or Labour Day is not an official holiday. This is due in part to its proximity to the national holiday, Koningsdag, which was celebrated on the day before until 2013. Labour movements also didn't see the need to agitate for an extra day off during the Post–World War II recovery efforts. Liberals who joined the Labour Party in this same period also wanted to distance themselves from the Soviet Union because of Cold War sentiments.

North Macedonia

In North Macedonia, 1 May is an official public holiday. Before 2007, 2 may was also a public holiday. People celebrate with friends and family at traditional picnics across the country, accompanied by the usual outdoor games, various grilled meats and beverages. Left organizations and some trade unions organize protests on 1 May.

Norway

In Norway, Labour Day is celebrated 1 May and is an official public holiday. It was introduced in 1942 by Vidkun Quisling of the Nasjonal Samling party modelled after the german  	Nationaler Feiertag des deutschen Volkes.

Poland

In Poland, since the fall of communism, 1 May is officially celebrated as May Day, but is commonly called Labour Day.  it is currently celebrated without a specific connotation, and as such it is May Day. However, due to historical connotations, most of the large organized celebrations are focused around Labour Day festivities. It is customary for labour activists to organize parades in cities and towns across Poland. The holiday is also commonly referred to as "Labour Day".

In Poland, May Day is closely followed by May 3rd Constitution Day. These two dates combined often result in a long weekend called , which may last for up to 9 days from 28 April to 6 May, at the cost of taking only 3 days off.

Between these two, on 2 May, there is a patriotic holiday, the Day of the Polish Flag, introduced by a Parliamentary Act of 20 February 2004. The day, however, does not force paid time off.

Portugal
In Portugal, the 1 May celebration was suppressed during the Estado Novo dictatorship. The first workers' day demonstration was held a week after the Carnation Revolution of 25 April 1974. It is still the largest demonstration in the history of Portugal. It is used as an opportunity for workers and  workers' groups to voice their discontent over working conditions in demonstrations across Portugal, the largest being held in Lisbon. It is an official public holiday.

Romania

In Romania, 1 May, known as the International Labour Day, the International Workers' Day, or simply 1/First of May,  is an official public holiday. During the communist regime, like in all former Eastern Bloc countries, the day was marked by large state-organized parades in most towns and cities. After the Romanian Revolution of 1989, 1 May continues to be an official public holiday, but without any state organized events or parades. Most people celebrate together with friends and family, organising picnics and barbecues. It is also the first day of the year when people, especially those from the southeastern part of the country including the capital Bucharest, go to spend the day in one of the Romanian Black Sea resorts.

Russia

May Day, also known in Russia as the Day of International Workers Solidarity, the 1st of May was celebrated illegally in the country until the February Revolution enabled the first legal celebration in 1917. The following year, after the Bolshevik seizure of power, the May Day celebrations were boycotted by Mensheviks, Left Socialist Revolutionaries and anarchists. It became an important official holiday of the Soviet Union, celebrated with elaborate popular parade in the centre of the major cities. The biggest celebration was traditionally organized in Red Square, where the General Secretary of the CPSU and other party and government leaders stood atop Lenin's Mausoleum and waved to the crowds. Until 1969, the holiday was marked by military parades throughout the Russian SFSR and the union republics. The following was the order of the march past:

 Parade commander holding the appointment of commanding officer of the Moscow Military District
 Corps of Drums of the Moscow Military Music College
 Frunze Military Academy
 V.I. Lenin Military Political Academy
 Felix Dzerzhinsky Artillery Academy
 Military Armored Forces Academy Marshal Rodion Malinovsky
 Military Engineering Academy
 Military Academy of Chemical Defense and Control
 Yuri Gagarin Air Force Academy
 Prof. Nikolai Zhukovsky Air Force Engineering Academy
 Delegation of naval officer cadets from the Soviet Navy
 98th Guards Airborne Division
 Moscow Border Guards Institute of the Border Defence Forces of the KGB "Moscow City Council"
 Separate Operational Purpose Division
 336th Marine Brigade of the Baltic Fleet
 Suvorov Military School and Nakhimov Naval Schools
 Moscow Military Combined Arms Command Training School "Supreme Soviet of the Russian SFSR"
 Mobile Column
 2nd Guards Motor Rifle Division
 4th Guards Tank Division
 Missile Troops and Artillery of the Moscow Military District
 1st Aerospace Defense Army
 Northern Fleet and Baltic Fleet Coastal Defense, Surface and Submarine Forces (until 1974)
 Massed Bands of the Moscow Military District (parade finale)

The first of these parades were held 1918, when Vladimir Lenin presided over a ceremony at Khodynka Field. Notable parades included the parade of 1941 (which saw the presence of a Wehrmacht delegation led by Ernst August Köstring) and 1963 (where Cuban leader Fidel Castro was a guest). The only parades on 1 May to be cancelled were the parades scheduled during the years of the Second World War and the 1965 parade (this was cancelled to make way for the 1965 Moscow Victory Day Parade nine days later). In 1979, ten years after the last annual parade, a brief exhibition drill and military tattoo of the forces of the Moscow Garrison took place.

In 1991, which preceded the last year that demonstrations were held in Red Square, May Day grew into high-spirited political action. Around 50,000 people participated in a rally in Red Square in 1991 after which the tradition was interrupted for 13 years. In the early post-Soviet period the holiday turned into massive political gatherings of supporters of radically minded politicians. For instance, an action dubbed as "a rally of communist-oriented organisations" was held in Red Square in 1992. The rally began with performance of the Soviet Union anthem and raising the Red Flag and ended with appeals from the leader of opposition movement Working Moscow, Viktor Anpilov, "for early dismissal of President Boris Yeltsin, ousting Moscow Mayor Gavriil Popov from power and putting the latter on trial". Since 1992, May Day is officially called "The Day of Spring and Labour", and remains a major holiday in present-day Russia.

Since 2014 a national civil parade is held on that day on Red Square with similar events held in major cities and regional capitals.

Serbia
In Serbia, 1 May (and also 2 May) is a day off work and a day out of school. It is one of the major popular holidays, and the only official holiday from socialist times that is still officially celebrated. People celebrate it all over the country. By tradition 1 May is celebrated by countryside picnics and outdoor barbecues. May is marked by warm weather in Serbia. People go around the country to enjoy nature.

Slovakia
In Slovakia, 1 May is an official holiday. Celebrations are held surrounding workers' day but are also connected with the commemoration of the entry of the Slovak Republic into the European Union (1 May 2004).

Slovenia
In Slovenia, 1 May and 2 May are public holidays. There are many official events all over the country to celebrate workers' day. In Ljubljana, the capital, the main celebration is held on Rožnik Hill in the city. On the night of 30 April, bonfires are traditionally burned.

Spain

The first Día del Trabajador was celebrated in 1889 but only became a public holiday with the beginning of the Spanish Second Republic in 1931. It was banned afterwards by the Franco regime in 1937. The year after it was decreed that the "Fiesta de la Exaltación del Trabajo," or Labor Festival, be held on 18 July, the anniversary of the Francoist military coup, instead. After the death of Francisco Franco in 1975 and the move towards democracy, the first large rallies on 1 May began again in 1977. It was re-introduced as a public holiday in 1978. Commonly, peaceful demonstrations and parades occur in major and minor cities.

Sweden

1 May has been an important part of Swedish history since the late 19th century. The day was made a public holiday in 1938 but had been celebrated by the Swedish Social Democratic Party and the left since 1890. The first May Day celebration gathered more than 50,000 people in central Stockholm. The crowd went to hear speeches by the leading figures in the Swedish labour movement such as Hjalmar Branting (later prime minister), August Palm and Hinke Bergegren. During World War I the demonstrations mainly had a peace message and the Liberal Party also joined the demonstrations. The eight-hour working day and women's suffrage were the principal themes during the troubled times after World War I.

Recognizing the central contributions of workers and international worker solidarity in Swedish social, economic, political and cultural development, May Day demonstrations are an important part of Swedish politics and culture for social democrats, left parties, and unions. In Stockholm the  Social Democratic Party always marches towards Norra Bantorget, the historical, physical centre of the Swedish labour movement, where they hold speeches in front of the headquarters of the Swedish Trade Union Confederation, while the smaller Left Party marches in larger numbers towards Kungsträdgården.

In 2016, Röd Front marches were held at 33 locations across the country. The largest Röd Front marches are usually held in the industrial and financial port town of Gothenburg, Sweden's second-largest city and one of the party's strongholds.

Switzerland
In Switzerland, the status of 1 May differs depending on the canton and sometimes on the municipality.
This is equal in practice to an official public holiday, but is not based on federal law and cantonal regulations may differ in details.
 In the canton of Solothurn it is an official half-day holiday (starting at 12 noon).
 In the canton of  it is not an official holiday, but most employees get the afternoon off.
 In all other cantons, 1 May is a regular work day.

Each year, 's 1 May committee, together with the Swiss Federation of Trade Unions, organizes a festival and 1 May rally. It is the largest rally held on a regular basis in Switzerland.

Turkey

1 May is an official holiday celebrated in Turkey. It was a holiday until 1981 when it was cancelled after the 1980 coup d'état. In 2010, the Turkish government restored the holiday after some casualties and demonstrations. Taksim Square is the centre of the celebrations due to the Taksim Square massacre.

After the establishment of the Turkish Republic, it became an official holiday. In 1924, it was forbidden by a decree and in both 1924 and 1925, demonstrations were intervened by arm floats. In 1935, The National Assembly declared Workers' Day to be a holiday again.

During the events leading to the 1980 Turkish coup d'etat, a massacre occurred on 1 May 1977 (Taksim Square massacre), in which unknown people (agents provocateurs) opened fire on the crowd.  The crowd was the biggest in Turkish workers' history with the number of people approximating 500,000. In the next two years, provocations and confusion continued and peaked before the 1980 coup d'etat. The Workers' Day holiday was cancelled once again. Still, demonstrations continued with small crowds, and in 1996, three people were killed by police bullets, and a plain-clothes man who spied in the crowd was revealed and lynched by workers. On the same evening, a video broadcast on TV showed that two participants in the demonstration were lynched by far right-wing nationalist groups and this lynching occurred in front of police forces who were watching the scene with happy faces. Thus, 1 May 1996 has been remembered by workers' movements.

In 2007, the 30th anniversary of the Taksim square massacre, leftist workers' unions wanted to commemorate the massacre in Taksim Square. Since the government would not let them into the square, 580–700 people were stopped and 1 person died under police control. After these events, the government declared 1 May as "Work and Solidarity Day" but not as a holiday. In the next year, the day was declared as a holiday, but people were still not allowed to gather in Taksim Square. The year 2008 was remembered with police violence in Istanbul. Police fired tear gas grenades among the crowds, and into hospitals and a primary school. Workers pushed forward so that in 2010, 140,000 people gathered in Taksim, and in 2011 there were more than half a million demonstrators.

After three years of peaceful meetings in 2013, meetings in Taksim Square were forbidden by the government. Clashes occurred between police and workers; water cannon and tear gas have been widely used.

Ukraine
It is a public holiday in Ukraine, inherited from the Soviet era. May Day as a day of workers' solidarity in Kyiv began as early as 1894. Until 2018, 2 May was also a public holiday (as in the Soviet era), instead in 2017 Western Christianity's Christmas celebrated 25 December became a new Ukrainian public holiday. The 1 May International Workers' Day remained a Ukrainian public holiday, although it was renamed (also in 2017) from "Day of International Solidarity of Workers" to "Labour Day".

In 2015, May Day rallies were banned in Kyiv and Kharkiv.

Late May 2015 laws that ban communist symbols came into effect in Ukraine, thus banning communist symbols, singing the Soviet national hymn or the Internationale.

According to Interior Minister Arsen Avakov during the 2016 May Day rallies in some major cities the number of police officers far outnumbered the number of rally participants. With in Dnipro 193 policemen protecting 25 rally participants.

United Kingdom
A public bank holiday in the United Kingdom known as May Day was created in 1978 and is held on the first Monday in May each year.

There are many traditional May Day rites and celebrations, some of which have been held for hundreds of years. However, it was not until the late 20th century that May Day in Great Britain became linked to International Workers' Day, and the holiday is not officially a "Labour Day".

Oceania

Australia

While unofficial activities and commemorations associated with International Workers Day occur on May Day in Australia, Labour Day in the various states and territories generally falls on other days. Only in the Northern Territory (where it is called May Day) and Queensland is Labour Day celebrated on the first Monday in May, which is a public holiday under the name of "May Day". Queensland holds the biggest rallies in Australia, with the rally in Brisbane averaging 30,000 people.  In Australia, one of the first May Day marches occurred in Queensland on 1 May 1891. There are also rallies held in Cairns, Rockhampton, Townsville, Barcaldine, Ipswich, Toowoomba, Bundaberg, Maryborough, Sunshine Coast, Gold Coast and other regional centres.

New Zealand
New Zealand workers were among the first in the world to claim the right for an eight-hour working day when, in 1840, the carpenter Samuel Parnell won an eight-hour day in Wellington. Labour Day was first celebrated in New Zealand on 28 October 1890. Labour day falls every year on the fourth Monday of October.

South Asia

Bangladesh
In Bangladesh, 1 May Day is a public holiday and called May Day. A parade and other events are held on the day to commemorate the occasion.

India

In India, Labour Day is a public holiday held on every 1 May. The holiday is tied to labour movements for communist and socialist political parties. Labour Day is known as "Uzhaipalar dhinam" in Tamil and was first celebrated in Madras, "Kamgar Din" in Hindi, "Karmikara Dinacharane" in Kannada,"Karmika Dinotsavam" in Telugu, "Kamgar Divas" in Marathi, "Thozhilaali Dinam" in Malayalam and "Shromik Dibosh" in Bengali. Since Labour day is not a national holiday, Labour day is observed as public holiday at State Government's discretion. Many parts especially in North Indian States it is not a public holiday.

The first celebration in India was organized in Madras (now Chennai) by the Labour Kisan Party of Hindustan on 1 May 1923. This was also the first time the red flag was used in India. The party leader Singaravelu Chettiar made arrangements to celebrate May Day in two places in 1923. One meeting was held at the beach opposite to the Madras High Court; the other meeting was held at the Triplicane beach. The Hindu newspaper, published from Madras reported,

The Labour Kisan party has introduced May Day celebrations in Madras. Comrade Singaravelar presided over the meeting. A resolution was passed stating that the government should declare May Day as a holiday. The president of the party explained the non-violent principles of the party. There was a request for financial aid. It was emphasised that workers of the world must unite to achieve independence.

1 May is also celebrated as "Maharashtra Day" and "Gujarat Day" to mark the date in 1960, when the two western states attained statehood after the erstwhile Bombay State was divided on linguistic lines. Maharashtra Day is held at Shivaji Park in central Mumbai. Schools and offices in Maharashtra remain closed on 1 May. A similar parade is held to celebrate Gujarat Day in Gandhinagar.

Vaiko (Vai Gopalsamy), General Secretary of Marumalarchi Dravida Munnetra Kazhagam, appealed to the then Prime Minister V. P. Singh to declare 1 May as a national holiday, to which the PM heeded and from then on it became a national holiday to celebrate International Labour Day.

Maldives
Maldives first observed the holiday in 2011, after a declaration by President Mohamed Nasheed. He noted that this move highlighted the government's commitment as well as efforts of private parties to protect and promote workers' rights in the Maldives.

Nepal
1 May Day has been celebrated in Nepal since 1963. The day became a public holiday in 2007.

Pakistan
International Labour Day is observed in Pakistan on 1 May to commemorate the social and economic achievements of workers. It is a public and national holiday. Many organized street demonstrations take place on Labor Day, where workers and labor unions protest against labor repression and demand for more rights, better wages and benefits.

Sri Lanka
In Sri Lanka, it is observed on 1 May and is a government and public holiday. The government has held official May Day celebrations in major towns and cities, with the largest being in the capital, Colombo. During celebrations, it is common to witness party leaders greeting the crowds. Workers frequently carry banners with political slogans and many parties decorate their vehicles.

Southeast Asia

Cambodia
In Cambodia, it is known as International Labour Day and is a public holiday. No marches for labour day were permitted in Cambodia for several years after the 2013 Cambodian general election and surrounding mass protests. A tightly controlled march on a limited scale was first permitted again in 2019.

Indonesia

May Day (often referred locally as Labour Day) in Indonesia was first observed as a public holiday from 2014. Every year on the day, labourers take over the streets in major cities across the country, voicing their demands for better income & a supportive policy by the ministries.

Malaysia
Malaysia began observing the holiday in 1972 following an announcement by the late Malaysian Deputy Prime Minister, Ismail Abdul Rahman.

Myanmar
In Myanmar, 1 May is known as Labour Day  and is a public holiday.

Philippines
1 May is known as Labor Day (also known as Araw ng Paggawa) and is a public holiday in the Philippines. On this day, labour organizations and unions hold protests in major cities. Ten years later, the first official celebration was held on 1 May 1913 when 36 labour unions convened for a congress in Manila.

During the Presidency of Gloria Macapagal-Arroyo, a policy was adopted called holiday economics policy that moved holidays to either a Monday or a Friday to create a long weekend of three days. In 2002, Labor Day was moved to the Monday nearest to 1 May. Labour groups protested, as they accused the Arroyo administration of belittling the holiday. By 2008, Labor Day was excluded in the holiday economics policy, returning the commemorations to 1 May, no matter what day of the week it falls on.

Singapore
In Singapore, it is known as Labour Day and is a public holiday.

Thailand
In Thailand, the day is known in English as National Labour Day, and is one of 17 official public holidays in Thailand.

Vietnam 
In Vietnam, it is known as International Labour Day and is a public holiday. It was first adopted by the Nguyễn dynasty on the 11th day of the 9th month of the 16th year of the Bảo Đại Emperor (30 October 1941) by imperial decree. Later on 29 April 1946 President Hồ Chí Minh issued Sắc lệnh số 56 (Decree No. 56) which adopted the holiday for the Democratic Republic of Vietnam.

According to the decree "workers in public offices, private offices and factories throughout the country are entitled to a day off from work. International Labour 1.5 and still receive the same salary as a working day…". On 1 May 1946 the first International Labour Day of the Democratic Republic of Vietnam was held.

West Asia

Bahrain
In Bahrain, 1 May is known as Labour Day and is a public holiday.

Iran
In Iran, 1 May is known as the International Workers' Day. It is not a public holiday but according to article 63 of Iranian labour law on top of the official public holidays observed in the Islamic Republic of Iran, Labour Day shall be considered an official holiday for workers.

Iraq
In Iraq, it is known as the International Workers' Day and is a public holiday.

Israel

After historically varying popularity of Labour Day, 1 May is not an official holiday in the State of Israel. In the 1980s there were several large marches in Tel Aviv, numbering as much as 350,000 in 1983 and perhaps even more in 1988, but a steady decline in numbers led to only 5,000 marchers in 2010. During the 1990s businesses began to treat it like a regular working day as the number of May Day-related activities decreased. 1 May is largely celebrated by the former Soviet Jews who immigrated to Israel in the 1990s.

Jordan
1 May is known as Labour Day and is a public holiday.

Lebanon
1 May known as the Workers' Day and is a public holiday. Left-wing parties and workers' unions organize marches on 1 May.

Palestine
1 May is known as Labour Day and is a public holiday.

Yemen
1 May is known as Labour Day and is a public holiday.

See also

 Workers' Memorial Day
 Pervomaysky (disambiguation)

Notes

References

Further reading

External links
 
 May Day Archive at the Marxists Internet Archive
 Photos of May Day in Red Square during the Soviet Union

May Day protests
History of anarchism
Labour movement
May observances
International observances
Trade unions
Protests
Anti-capitalism
Industrial Workers of the World
Syndicalism
Communism
Socialism
Public holidays in Russia
Public holidays in the Soviet Union
Public holidays in Sweden
Public holidays in the United Kingdom
Public holidays in Ukraine
Public holidays in Vietnam
Public holidays in China
Labour days
Public holidays in Uruguay
Finnish flag flying days
Public holidays in Finland
German flag flying days
Norwegian flag flying days
Public holidays in Norway
Public holidays in South Africa
Swedish flag flying days